The following is a list of assets formerly owned by Tribune Media

Television

Television stations 
Stations are listed alphabetically by state and city of license.

Note:
 (**) – Indicates a station that was built and signed-on by Tribune.
 (¤¤) – Indicates a station owned by Renaissance Broadcasting prior to its acquisition by Tribune in 1997. KDVR and WCCT (as WTXX) were divested by Renaissance years prior, only to be acquired by Tribune in future acquisitions.
 (++) – Indicates a station owned by Local TV LLC prior to its acquisition by Tribune in 2013.
 (‡‡) – Indicates a station owned by Dreamcatcher Broadcasting, LLC, Tribune operated these stations through Local marketing agreement.

Radio stations 

Notes:
 1 WGWG-LP is owned by Venture Technologies Group, and was operated by Tribune under a local marketing agreement. Tribune was supposed to hold the LMA until 2015, the FCC's deadline for converting low-power television stations to digital broadcasting, however due to low ratings, Weigel Broadcasting announced on December 30, 2014, that they would take over the Station's LMA from Tribune & would change formats. The LMA with Tribune ended on February 23, 2015, when Weigel took over the Station & changed the format to Oldies. The Callsign was also changed to WRME-LP. Although licensed as a television station on channel 6, it is also operated as a radio station.
 2 Owned by iHeart, and was operated by Tribune from August 2009 to December 1, 2018. The Station broadcast WITI's news & weather updates & most of its local programming. The simulcast of WITI & the operations by Tribune ended on December 1, 2018, when WMIL-FM switched its HD3's subchannel format.
 3 From 2008 to 2013, Local TV LLC had operated KWGN-TV and KPLR-TV under local marketing agreements with KDVR and KTVI.

Other TV Assets
 Tribune Entertainment
 Andromeda
 BeastMaster
 Candid Camera
 City Guys
 Earth: Final Conflict
 Family Feud
 Mutant X
 Pet Keeping
 Ron Hazelton: House Calls
 Soul Train
 South Park
 Tribune Broadcasting
 Cable Channels
 Food Network | Joint venture with Discovery Inc., sold to Nexstar Media Group in 2019.
 The WB | Joint venture with Warner Bros Television, dissolved in 2006.
 Cooking Channel | Joint venture with Discovery Inc., sold to Nexstar Media Group in 2019.
 WGN America | Sold to Nexstar Media Group in 2019
 Chicagoland Television | Sold to Nexstar Media Group in 2019

Newspapers
 Tribune Publishing
 Hoy (newspaper), New York, NY | Sold to ImpreMedia LLC in 2007 (non-New York versions of Hoy remain assets of Tribune)
 The Advocate, Stamford, CT | Sold to Hearst Corporation in 2007
 Chicago Tribune, spun off to Tribune Publishing in 2014
 Los Angeles Times, spun off to Tribune Publishing in 2014
 Baltimore Sun, spun off to Tribune Publishing in 2014
 South Florida Sun-Sentinel, spun off to Tribune Publishing in 2014
 Orlando Sentinel, spun off to Tribune Publishing in 2014
 Daily Press of Newport News, Va., spun off to Tribune Publishing in 2014
 Hartford Courant, spun off to Tribune Publishing in 2014
 The Morning Call of Allentown, Pa., spun off to Tribune Publishing in 2014
 The Virginian-Pilot, of Norfolk, VA, spun off to Tribune Publishing in 2018

Computer tabloids
 Tribune News Service, spun off to Tribune Publishing in 2014
 Metromix, spun off to Tribune Publishing in 2014
 CareerBuilder, Sold to Apollo Global Management
 Topix, Sold to Topix LLC in 2007
 Television Without Pity, Closed in 2017
 Tribune Media Services, spun off to Tribune Publishing in 2014

Other
 Zap2it | Sold to Nexstar Media Group in 2019
 TV by the Numbers | Sold to Nexstar Media Group in 2019
 Chicago Cubs | Sold to Thomas S. Ricketts family in 2009

See also
 Lists of corporate assets

References

 Columbia Journalism Review

Tribune Company